Demmin is a surname, which may be derived from Demmin, Germany.

Notable people with this surname include:
 Craig Demmin (born 1971), Trinidad and Tobago footballer
 Dwyane Demmin (born 1975), Trinidad and Tobago footballer
 Joyce Demmin, Trinidad and Tobago cricketer

See also
Demmin (disambiguation)

References